Institute for Public Affairs may refer to:

 Cornell Institute for Public Affairs
 Institute for Public Affairs (Slovakia) (IVO), a Slovakian think tank and non-governmental organization
 Institute for Public Affairs (U.S.), publisher of In These Times magazine
 Institute of Public Affairs of the University of Chile

See also 
 Couchiching Institute on Public Affairs
 Georgian Institute of Public Affairs (GIPA), in the Republic of Georgia
 Gokhale Institute of Public Affairs
 Institute of Public Affairs, Melbourne
 Institute of Public Affairs, Poland